This article chronicles the history of the Fine Gael political party since its inception.

Origins

In the face of intimidation of Cumann na nGaedheal meetings by the anti-treaty IRA and the rise in support for Éamon de Valera's Fianna Fáil from 1926, a new strategy was required to strengthen the voice of the pro-Treaty tradition who found themselves in opposition. The National Guard, popularly known as the Blueshirts, and originally the Army Comrades Association, a nationalist-conservative and covertly fascist movement led by Eoin O'Duffy, took up the task of defending Cumann na nGaedheal rallies from republican intimidation. When they planned a march on Dublin, de Valera banned the demonstration, fearing a repeat of Mussolini's infamous March on Rome. As a result, Fine Gael–The United Ireland Party was founded as an independent party on 8 September 1933, following a merger of Cumann na nGaedheal, the National Centre Party and the National Guard. The merger brought together two strands of Irish nationalism namely the pro-treaty wing of revolutionary Sinn Féin and the old Home Rule party represented by Dillon and the Centre Party. In reality, the new party was a larger version of Cumann na nGaedheal, the party created in 1923 by the Pro-Treaty leaders of the Irish Free State under WT Cosgrave.

The new party sought to end the Economic War, improve relations with Britain while advocating a United Ireland within the framework of the Commonwealth. After a short hiatus under the disastrous leadership of General Eoin O'Duffy, Cosgrave returned to lead the new party, continuing in the leadership until 1944. During this time, the party reverted to what it had been like during the days of Cumann na nGaedheal, much to the disappointment of those who had advocated a merger on the basis of creating a better organised party machine. Although the people who formed the party had been in government for ten years in the Irish Free State (1922–32), once Fianna Fáil under Éamon de Valera came to power in 1932, Fine Gael spent the next sixteen years in the doldrums, overshadowed by the larger party. Indeed, at times, it went into what was thought to be terminal decline on the opposition benches. Cosgrave finally resigned as leader in 1944 and was replaced by General Richard Mulcahy The party's fortunes seemed to be on the rise as the new leader sought to cast away the legacy of a weak party organisation that Cosgrave had bequeathed to Fine Gael. By the time the 1948 election was called, a number of first time candidates had been selected, with four of these subsequently elected as TDs.

Inter-party governments
When the votes were counted in the 1948 general election, Fine Gael had 31 seats. While not disastrous given the number of young candidates returned and that the purely party vote had been retained despite the loss of key personalities, it was still a result that showed little promise for the future. However, Fianna Fáil had not won an overall majority. Nevertheless, it appeared that no other party could possibly form a government, as Fianna Fáil still had 30 more seats than Fine Gael.

The situation changed when the anti-Fianna Fáil parties realised that if they banded together, they had only one seat fewer than Fianna Fáil, and would be able to take power with the support of at least seven independents. However, some of the other parties in the prospective coalition considered Mulcahy, to be too controversial a potential Taoiseach.

Notably, Clann na Poblachta (under former anti-Treaty IRA chief of staff, Seán MacBride), were opposed to him because of his role as Chief of Staff of the Irish Army in the execution of republicans during the Irish Civil War. Mulcahy selflessly stepped aside and former Attorney-General John A. Costello was chosen to head the First Inter-Party Government, which lasted from 1948 to 1951. Costello was an effective chairman of a coalition comprising many different shades of opinion. That Government is remembered for establishing the Industrial Development Authority and the formal declaration of a republic in 1949. Also a record number of houses were built, improvements were made in the tourism industry and the health minister Noel Browne successfully tackled the tuberculosis disease. Costello also headed the Second Inter-Party Government, which had a much stronger Fine Gael representation, from 1954 to 1957. Fine Gael's Foreign Minister Liam Cosgrave negotiated Ireland's entry to the United Nations in 1955 and, in doing so, defined Irish foreign policy for decades.

The party's Health Minister Tom O'Higgins introduced the Voluntary Health Insurance Board (VHI) and thus established Ireland's partly insurance-based health service that persists today. Fianna Fáil and de Valera were returned to power in 1957, banishing Fine Gael once more to the opposition benches.

Costello's Government, although it decided against the re-introduction of internment, responded to the activities of Saor Uladh and the mainstream IRA by stepping up security measures against these groups, leading to the arrest of prominent republicans. In response to this and to a rapid deterioration in the state of the economy, Clann na Poblachta withdrew its support and Costello was left with no choice other than to call an election.

The Just Society and Tom O'Higgins
Out of government, Fine Gael again went into decline. In the mid-1960s, however, it launched a new policy statement, known as The Just Society, advocating policies based on principles of social justice and equality. That document was the brainchild of Declan Costello, a Fine Gael TD and son of former Taoiseach John A. Costello, and reflected an emerging faction in the party that was being influenced by Social Democracy. This new strand of thinking in Fine Gael paved the way for the rise within the party of liberal thinkers such as Garret FitzGerald. Party leaders of the time remained conservative but the seeds of the 1980s revolution had been sown. In 1966, Fine Gael's young presidential candidate, Tom O'Higgins, came within 1% of defeating the sitting president, Éamon de Valera, in that year's presidential election. This was regarded as a substantial achievement as Fianna Fáil had persuaded RTÉ to provide no coverage of the campaign and the election was held in the year of the 50th anniversary of the Easter Rising in which de Valera had played a prominent role. O'Higgins came from the emerging social democratic wing of the party.

When James Dillon resigned as Fine Gael leader in 1965, Liam Cosgrave (the son of Cumann na nGaedheal founder W. T. Cosgrave) was chosen to replace him. The swift changeover was viewed as a means of keeping control of the party away from the emerging centre-left wing. However, the party's two factions continued to feud. With events in Northern Ireland spiralling out of control, Liam Cosgrave sought to focus Fine Gael minds on its role as protector of the state's institutions. At the Fine gael Ard Fheis in May 1972, the 50th anniversary of the foundation of the state, Cosgrave rounded on his enemies. He ridiculed liberals in the party who were distracting his efforts to bring about a settlement in the North. His speech memorably likened his critics to "mongrel foxes" that had gone to ground. In the wake of the Fianna Fáil Arms Crisis and Cosgrave's strong performances in opposition in defending the institutions of the State, the party was well-positioned to return to Government with the Labour Party (which had altered its 1960s anti-coalition stance).

National Coalition
After a break of sixteen years, Fine Gael returned to power in 1973, at the head of a National Coalition government with Labour, under Cosgrave's leadership, on the basis of a pre-election agreement between the two parties and active encouragement of each party's supporters to record preferences for the other party's candidates. That government has generally been regarded as a well-meaning government containing much political talent, but was hit by frequent problems. Some of these were outside its control (for example the 1970s oil crisis and escalating violence in Northern Ireland), while others were its own direct creation notably the public criticism on President Cearbhall Ó Dalaigh, by Minister for Defence, Patrick Donegan, in which the latter referred to the President as a "thundering disgrace". (Some witnesses to the speech recall the Minister as having employed a more forceful and colloquial adjective than "thundering.") President Ó Dálaigh's subsequent resignation in 1976, in response to Cosgrave's refusal to discipline his unruly subordinate, severely damaged the National Coalition's reputation.

Cosgrave, like his father before him, showed a fierce determination to defend the institutions of state and would not compromise with extremists, instead working towards reconciliation. The National Coalition is noted for its attempts to build a power-sharing executive in Northern Ireland through the Sunningdale Agreement. The Sunningdale Agreement collapsed after a loyalist general strike. However, it left a legacy of compromise that would lead to later Agreements aimed at bringing peace to the troubled region. The government's record in the area of civil liberties is more mixed, with allegations that an official blind eye was turned to the abuse in custody of republican suspects by a so-called "Heavy Gang" within the Garda Síochána, or police force. It was the Coalition's failure to address the economic problems of the day, however, with inflation, unemployment and national indebtedness all running at record levels, that led to its ultimate repudiation by the voters. In 1977 the Fine Gael/Labour government suffered a heavy defeat, with Fianna Fáil winning an unprecedented 20-seat majority in the 148-seat Dáil, a landslide under proportional representation.

Garret FitzGerald
Cosgrave resigned the leadership and was replaced by Garret FitzGerald. FitzGerald had been a successful Minister for Foreign Affairs in the National Coalition, his affable style and liberal views doing much to change the stereotypical European view of Ireland (and perhaps Ireland's of itself). FitzGerald was one of Ireland's most popular politicians and son of Desmond FitzGerald, a Cumann na nGaedheal Minister for External Affairs. He moved Fine Gael leftwards to the centre ground and promoted the so-called Liberal Agenda. He also founded the autonomous youth movement Young Fine Gael, while the party attracted thousands of new members. Fine Gael seemed trendy under FitzGerald's leadership (for instance, U2 endorsed them at this time). Fine Gael's revitalisation was on such a scale that by the November 1982 general election, Fine Gael was only five seats behind Fianna Fáil in Dáil Éireann and bigger than its rival in the Oireachtas as a whole (i.e. counting the number of representatives in both houses of parliament). As Taoiseach, FitzGerald attempted to create a more pluralist Republic. In 1985 after lengthy negotiations he succeeded in negotiating the Anglo-Irish Agreement. This gave the Republic a say in the affairs of Northern Ireland while improving the Anglo-Irish relationship. Nevertheless, Fine Gael under Fitzgerald failed to control spiralling emigration and unemployment, though the intransigence of Labour leader Dick Spring with regard to taxation and public spending did not help. FitzGerald headed three governments: 1981 – February 1982, 1982 – 1987, and a short-lived Fine Gael minority government when Labour withdrew from the previous coalition as tensions had developed between the coalition partners over how to tackle the economy. In 1987 the party was defeated heavily in the general election of that year. FitzGerald resigned and his close ally and former Minister for Finance Alan Dukes replaced him, but continued to lead the party in the same socially democratic vein.

Rainbow Coalition
From a highpoint in the 1980s, Fine Gael went into slight, then sharp decline. Despite Dukes launching the Tallaght Strategy in 1987, the party gained just four seats in the following general election. In 1990, its candidate in the Irish presidential election, Austin Currie, was pushed into a humiliating third place, behind the winner, Labour's Mary Robinson and Fianna Fáil's Brian Lenihan. This led to John Bruton replacing Alan Dukes as the party's leader. In 1989, political history was made when Fianna Fáil abandoned one of its "core principles", its opposition to coalition. Having failed in 1987 and 1989 to win outright majorities, Fianna Fáil entered into a coalition administration with the Progressive Democrats. Commentators predicted that that would leave Fine Gael isolated, with Fianna Fáil able to swap coalition partners to keep itself continuously in power. This was also precipitated by the fact that now, under its new pact with the Progressive Democrats, Fianna Fáil would now be able to, though remaining quite ideologically populist, dominate the fiscally conservative, right of centre vacuum previously dominated by Fine Gael. The rise of the Progressive Democrats diminished Fine Gael's chances of continuing to promote the Fitzgerald-ite liberal agenda alongside its more traditional, right wing economic conservatism. This phenomenon indeed became even more apparent when, after the 1992 general election, Fianna Fáil replaced the Progressive Democrats with the Labour Party in coalition. However the Fianna Fáil-Labour coalition disintegrated in 1994, allowing Bruton to emerge as Taoiseach of a three-party Rainbow Coalition, involving Fine Gael, Labour and Democratic Left. This was in spite of a pre-election promise in 1992 from Bruton that Fine Gael would not enter government with the Democratic Left, a party which had links to militant Irish republicanism, as well as being left leaning in its outlook.

This Government's first policy initiative was the introduction of divorce which was ratified in a referendum by a narrow majority. John Bruton gained respect for his leadership during the campaign. The Government also oversaw the first period of unprecedented economic growth, job creation on a massive scale and Ireland's first budget surplus in over twenty five years. The Irish economy continued to thrive under Fine Gael and Labour with the introduction of the 12.5% rate of corporation tax and a modest cut in income tax.

However, the Provisional IRA ceasefire ended in 1996, stalling the peace process. Many nationalists blamed the approach taken by Taoiseach John Bruton for this setback. The three parties worked well together and fought the 1997 election on a united platform. However, despite positive opinion polls throughout its time in office, the Government was narrowly defeated in the 1997 general election. Fine Gael gained nine seats but Labour lost heavily and the Rainbow Coalition was replaced by a Fianna Fáil-Progressive Democrats coalition under Bertie Ahern.

2002 meltdown
The party had little answer as popular Taoiseach Bertie Ahern cemented his title as the Teflon Taoiseach (a reference to his uncanny ability to emerge unscathed from controversy after controversy). The party, facing a hostile media and criticism of Bruton's style of leadership, ditched him in 2001 in place of what was seen as the dream ticket of former Minister Michael Noonan for leader and former minister Jim Mitchell for deputy leader. However the dream proved to be a nightmare, as Fine Gael suffered its worst-ever election result in the 2002 general election, declining from 54 TDs to 31. Many of its best TDs, including most of its front bench, in particular Deputy Leader Jim Mitchell, lost their seats. Noonan resigned on the night of the election result, and was replaced by former Trade and Tourism Minister Enda Kenny in the subsequent leadership election. With the scale of the collapse, questions were asked as to whether the party had a future.

Recovery under Enda Kenny
Under its new leader, Enda Kenny, Fine Gael staged a recovery in local and European elections held on 11 June 2004, becoming the largest Irish party in the European Parliament by winning five seats (compared to just four seats for the ruling Fianna Fáil party), while it came within nine seats of becoming the largest party in local government. The recovery for Fine Gael was complete when it gained 20 seats at the 2007 general election. The party entered into an electoral alliance with the Labour Party in Mullingar during 2005, the "Alliance For Change". This election, however, did not bring Fine Gael back into power. In the local elections of 2009, Fine Gael surpassed Fiannna Fáil, gaining over 40 seats and bringing the total up to 340 compared to Fianna Fáil's 180. At European level, Fine Gael was the largest party and won the Dublin South by-election with George Lee sweeping to victory with over 54% of the vote and just missing out on a seat in Dublin Central with Paschal Donohoe, although Lee later resigned from his position after only nine months due to having "virtually no influence or input" into shaping Fine Gael's economic policies.

In 2010, opinion polls had Labour ahead of Fine Gael with Fianna Fáil's collapse in the votes not transferring to Fine Gael. Deputy Leader Richard Bruton along with nine of the Fine Gael Front Bench challenged Enda Kenny for the leadership. In a bitter battle, Enda Kenny won the confidence vote of the party and set about healing the wounds. He reappointed Richard Bruton to the Front Bench along with bringing Michael Noonan back into the Front Bench as Spokesman on Finance. The arrival of the IMF to bail out the country's finances in November of that year saw Fianna Fáil implode. Fine Gael, with strong performances from Noonan and his team of deputies, saw Fine Gael support rise heading into the general election which was called in February 2011. Many believed Enda Kenny had a terrific campaign and the question was now whether Fine Gael could get an overall majority. When the votes were counted Fine Gael fell short with an historic seat total of 76 seats and 36.1% of the vote, becoming the largest party in the Dáil for the first time. The Fianna Fáil vote collapsed to 17.4% and 20 seats in the Dáil, compared to 41.6% and 77 seats at the previous general election. A new government was formed with the Labour Party under the leadership of Enda Kenny as Taoiseach. He had led the party from the abyss to the greatest victory in their history and now had the largest party in the state.

In July 2013 five TDs (Lucinda Creighton, Terence Flanagan, Peter Mathews, Billy Timmins and Brian Walsh) and two senators (Paul Bradford and Fidelma Healy Eames) were expelled from the Fine Gael parliamentary party for opposing the Fine Gael–Labour Party coalition's Protection of Life During Pregnancy Act 2013. In September 2013 they founded the Reform Alliance along with Denis Naughten, another Fine Gael TD who had been expelled for opposing the 2011 budget's downgrade of Roscommon County Hospital. Brian Walsh declined to join the bloc. Creighton had the highest profile of the founders, having been Minister of State for European Affairs prior to her expulsion. She denied being the leader of the new group.

Leo Varadkar & Grand Coalition

References

 
History of the Republic of Ireland
Ireland and the Commonwealth of Nations